Leon Sacks (October 7, 1902 – March 11, 1972) was a Democratic member of the U.S. House of Representatives from Pennsylvania.

Early life
Leon Sacks was born in Philadelphia, Pennsylvania, the son of Russian-Jewish immigrants.  He graduated from the Wharton School of the University of Pennsylvania at Philadelphia in 1923, and from the law department of the University of Pennsylvania in 1926.  He commenced the practice of law in Philadelphia in 1926.  He was appointed deputy Attorney General of Pennsylvania in February 1935 and served until January 1937.  He was elected as a member of the Democratic State committee in 1936 and served until 1942.

United States House of Representatives
He was elected in 1936 as a Democrat to the 75th United States Congress and to the two succeeding Congresses.  He was an unsuccessful candidate for reelection in 1942.

World War II and later life
Sacks served at Army Air Forces Eastern Flying Training Command, with the rank of lieutenant colonel, from January 4, 1943, to January 10, 1946, when resumed the practice of his profession.  He was a member of State Veterans Commission from 1951 to 1969, and the chairman of the registration commission of Philadelphia from 1952 to 1965.  He was a member of Military Reservations Commission from 1957 to 1967.

On March 11, 1972, Sacks died in Philadelphia at the age of 69.

See also
List of Jewish members of the United States Congress

References

The Political Graveyard

1902 births
1972 deaths
20th-century American politicians
Pennsylvania lawyers
Politicians from Philadelphia
Jewish American military personnel
United States Army Air Forces personnel of World War II
American people of Russian-Jewish descent
Wharton School of the University of Pennsylvania alumni
University of Pennsylvania Law School alumni
United States Army Air Forces officers
Democratic Party members of the United States House of Representatives from Pennsylvania
20th-century American lawyers
20th-century American Jews